El Marqués is a municipality in the Mexican state of Querétaro. It receives its name from Juan Antonio de Urrutia y Arana, the Marquis of the Villa del Villar del Águila, who built the aqueduct that supplied water to Querétaro for centuries. Its seat is the city of La Cañada. It forms part of the metropolitan area of Querétaro and has many state-of-the-art industrial parks and Querétaro International Airport.

Populated places in Querétaro
Municipalities of Querétaro